This is a list of famous and well-known aikido practitioners (aikidōka) sorted by area of primary residence.

Direct students of Morihei Ueshiba are marked with an asterisk*

Japan

The Ueshiba family
Morihei Ueshiba - founder of Aikido, often referred to as Ōsensei.
Kisshomaru Ueshiba - son of founder, second Dōshu*
Moriteru Ueshiba - son of Kisshomaru, third and current Dōshu
Mitsuteru Ueshiba - son of Moriteru and presumed successor

Other Japanese aikidoka

Non-Japanese in Japan
Jacques Payet

Australia

Europe

North America

South East Asia
Benjamin Galarpe

South America
Reishin Kawai

Literature 
Pranin, Stanley A, ed. Aikido masters: prewar students of Morihei Ueshiba. Tokyo: Aiki News. 1993.   This volume contains 14 in-depth interviews with direct participants in the early days of Aikido publisher

 Stone, John and Meyer, Ron (eds.) Aikido in America North Atlantic Books  1995.   Interviews limited to 13 aikidoists in the United States from 1990 to 1994; not meant to be comprehensive, Japanese teachers not covered. Editors were primarily interested in how Americans have responded to, changed, and expanded Aikido in the United States.

Aikidoka
de:Budōka#Aikidōka
fr:Aïkidoka#Liste d'aïkidokas